Eyjafjarðarsveit is a municipality located in northern Iceland.

Most of Eyjafjarðarsveit is located inland, but the northern tip borders a fjord. The major villages are Hrafnagil and Öngulsstaðir .

References

External links
Official website 

Municipalities of Iceland
Northeastern Region (Iceland)